This is a list of the French singles & airplay chart reviews number-ones of 1956.

Number-ones by week

Singles chart

See also
1956 in music
List of number-one hits (France)

References

1956 in France
France singles
Lists of number-one songs in France